Tub Run is a  long 3rd order tributary to the Youghiogheny River in Fayette County, Pennsylvania.

Variant names
According to the Geographic Names Information System, it has also been known historically as:
Tub Mill Run

Course
Tub Run rises about 2.5 miles north-northeast of Flat Rock, Pennsylvania, and then flows southeast to join the Youghiogheny River in Youghiogheny River Lake about 0.25 miles north of Somerfield.

Watershed
Tub Run drains  of area, receives about 48.8 in/year of precipitation, has a wetness index of 365.42, and is about 87% forested.

See also
List of rivers of Pennsylvania

References

Tributaries of the Youghiogheny River
Rivers of Pennsylvania
Rivers of Fayette County, Pennsylvania